William Eugene Blackstone (October 6, 1841 – November 7, 1935) was an American evangelist and Christian Zionist. He was the author of the Blackstone Memorial of 1891, a petition which called upon America to actively return the Holy Land to the Jewish people. Blackstone was influenced by Dwight Lyman Moody, James H. Brookes, and John Nelson Darby.  He is remembered as the author of the Blackstone Memorial.

Life and work
Blackstone was born in Adams, New York and became an evangelical Christian when he was 11 during revival meetings at a local Methodist church. He enlisted for military service during the American Civil War but was not accepted due to "frailness of body". Instead he joined the United States Christian Commission (similar to the modern Red Cross) and was stationed much of the time at General Ulysses S. Grant's headquarters as coordinator of medical services for injured combatants.

On June 5, 1866, Blackstone married Sarah Lee Smith (daughter of Philander Smith) and settled in Oak Park, Illinois in 1870, where he very successfully engaged in the "business of building and property investments". Blackstone, in a single night of personal spiritual struggle, decided to dedicate his life to God. Renouncing material pursuits, he proclaimed for the balance of his long life, in his preaching as well as in his writing, the premillennial return and rapture of the Church. As he ministered across the U.S., Blackstone spoke with increasing fervor in support of Jewish restorationism.

In 1878, he wrote, Jesus is Coming. His book became the veritable reference source of American dispensationalist thought. Over the next 50 years, Jesus is Coming sold multi-millions of copies worldwide and was translated into 48 languages.

He initially focused on the restoration of the Jews to the Holy Land as a prelude to their conversion to Christianity, out of a pious wish to hasten the coming of the Messiah; but he  increasingly became concerned with the deadly, Russian, government-instigated pogroms and believed that it was necessary to create a Jewish homeland in Israel.  He was, furthermore, persuaded that neither the European nations nor the United States would accept as many Jews as needed to escape from Europe.

Blackstone and his daughter  traveled to the Holy Land in 1888.  He returned convinced that a return of the Jewish people to its ancient homeland was the only possible solution to the persecution Jews suffered elsewhere. On November 24–25, 1890, Blackstone organized the Conference on the Past, Present and Future of Israel at the First Methodist Episcopal Church in Chicago where participants included leaders of both Jewish and Christian communities, albeit not leaders of the Reform movement.

The conference issued a call urging the great powers, including the Ottoman Empire, to return Israel to the Jews. Resolutions of sympathy for the oppressed Jews living in Russia were passed, but Blackstone was convinced that such resolutions – even though passed by prominent men – were insufficient. He advocated strongly for the voluntary resettlement of the Jewish people, suffering under virulent anti-Semitism, in Israel.

A year later in 1891, Blackstone led a petition drive that was approved by the conference. It was later known as the Blackstone Memorial. The memorial was signed by 413 prominent Christian and a few Jewish leaders in the United States. Blackstone personally gathered the signatures of men such as John D. Rockefeller, J.P. Morgan, Cyrus McCormick, senators, congressmen, religious leaders of all denominations, newspaper editors, the Chief Justice of the U.S. Supreme Court and others for the "Blackstone Memorial." He presented the "Memorial" to President Harrison, March 1891, calling for American support of Jewish restoration to Israel. His petition presaged and paralleled the later ideas of Theodor Herzl, the founder of the State of Israel, whose establishment of modern Zionism was outlined in his book, Der Judenstaat, 1896.

The Blackstone Memorial read, in part: 
Why shall not the powers which under the treaty of Berlin, in 1878, gave Bulgaria to the Bulgarians and Servia to the Servians now give Palestine back to the Jews?…These provinces, as well as Romania, Montenegro, and Greece, were wrested from the Turks and given to their natural owners. Does not Israel as rightfully belong to the Jews?

Also in 1891, Blackstone stated that, the general "law of dereliction" did not apply to the Jews in regard to Palestine: 
for they never abandoned the land. They made no treaty; they did not even surrender. They simply succumbed, after the most desperate conflict, to the overwhelming power of the Romans.

Learning of the rise of the Zionist movement, led by Theodor Herzl, Blackstone became an outspoken and ardent supporter of Zionism. When Herzlian Zionism considered the offer by the British government of an interim Jewish state in Uganda he campaigned against it.  He sent to Herzl a personal Bible outlined with the specific biblical references to Jewish restoration to Israel only.  The Bible was said to have been prominently displayed on Herzl's desk for many years. It is no longer locatable.

In 1904, he began teaching that the world has already been evangelized, citing Acts 2:5, 8:4, Mark 16:20 and Colossians 1:23. As one of the most popular evangelists in the United States, he traveled extensively continuing to spread the gospel until his death 31 years later.

Supreme Court Justice Louis D. Brandeis rediscovered the Blackstone Memorial in 1916 during the period of his raucous, at times anti-Semitic, Congressional appointment hearings. Brandeis, as head of the American Zionist movement, utilizing the intercession of Nathan Straus who first brought Brandeis's attention to the potential significance of the "Blackstone Memorial of 1891", sought out and formed an alliance with Blackstone.

Nathan Straus wrote to Reverend Blackstone, May 16, 1916, on behalf of Brandeis:
 
“Mr. Brandeis is perfectly infatuated with the work that you have done along the lines of Zionism. It would have done your heart good to have heard him assert what a valuable contribution to the cause your document is. In fact he agrees with me that you are the Father of Zionism, as your work antedates Herzl".

Brandeis requested that Blackstone reissue a "modern Blackstone Memorial" to President Wilson.  Brandeis understood the fundamentals of power politics and grassroots American Christian and American political support. Brandeis understood the support that Blackstone would raise for the "Memorial" would enable President Wilson to accept and endorse American Zionism and the later British Balfour Declaration, which set the course for the establishment of the State of Israel. Though 75 years of age, Reverend Blackstone energetically undertook the strenuous project.  Of particular note, Blackstone secured the endorsement of his Memorial to President Wilson from the Presbyterian Church.  President Wilson was a religiously observant Presbyterian. The Memorial, though presented to President Wilson only privately, was very effective in garnering President Wilson's support and in turn reassuring the British of American support for the Balfour Declaration. The Blackstone Memorial of 1916, unlike the Memorial of 1891, was never publicly presented.

Blackstone remained committed to Jewish restoration and Zionism for the balance of his long life. As a believing Evangelical Christian, he witnessed the seeming fulfillment of biblical prophecy as the Jewish state came back to life after 1900 years. Blackstone died thirteen years before Israel was founded in 1948. Without Rev. Blackstone's lifelong efforts to build American political support and American prophetic understanding of dispensationalism and restorationism, American support for Zionism and the State of Israel might have been very different. Famous during his life, he slipped into historical obscurity.

Reverend Blackstone died on November 7, 1935. He was buried in a modest grave at the Forest Lawn Cemetery in Glendale, California. All his evangelical life, Blackstone described himself as "God's Little Errand Boy."

References

External links

 
 Mideast Outpost: Dr. William Eugene Blackstone (Oct. 6, 1841  Nov. 7, 1935)  at mideastoutpost.com
 Blackstone Memorial at www.amfi.org
 The High Walls of Jerusalem, A History of the Balfour Declaration and the Birth of the British Mandate in Palestine, Ronald Sanders, Holt, Rinehart, Winston, 1983 New York
 Mason, Alpheus T., Brandeis, A Free Man's Life, (New York: Viking Press, 1956)
 The Politics of Christian Zionism, 1891–1948, Paul C. Merkley, Frank Cass Press, London, 1998
 Harry S. Truman and the Founding of Israel, Michael T. Benson, Praeger Publishers, 1997
 Louis D. Brandeis, a Life, Melvin Urofsky, Random House, N.Y., 2009
 Jesus is Coming: The Life and Work of William E. Blackstone (1841—1935) by Jonathan David Moorhead, Ph.D., Dallas Theological Seminary, 2008, 373 pages; publication number: 3318932 abstract 

1841 births
1935 deaths
American Christian Zionists
Methodists from New York (state)
American evangelicals
Writers from Oak Park, Illinois
People from Adams, New York